Winder Laird Stabler Jr. (May 2, 1930 – February 24, 2008) was an American attorney and politician from the state of Delaware.

Early life
Stabler was born in 1930 in Nashville, Tennessee. He moved with his family to Seaford at the age of nine. He attended school there until 1944. He then attended the Cranbrook School, a private school in Bloomfield Hills, Michigan.

Stabler graduated from Princeton University in 1952 and the University of Virginia Law School in 1954. He then returned to Delaware to practice law.

Political career
Stabler was appointed as a deputy attorney general in 1961. In 1965, he was elected to the Delaware House of Representatives. He was re-elected in 1966 and 1968 and served as majority leader during his second term of office.

In 1970, Stabler was elected as the Attorney General of Delaware. He served a single term from 1971 until 1975. Following his tenure as Attorney General, Stabler was appointed as the U.S. Attorney for Delaware by President Gerald Ford in 1975. He served in that capacity until 1977.

Stabler served as the Republican National Committeeman for Delaware from 1985 until 2005.

Illness and death
Stabler was diagnosed with oral cancer in 2005. He underwent two surgeries and the cancer went into remission. However, the cancer returned in 2007. He died on February 24, 2008, at the age of 77 in Montchanin, Delaware. He was survived by his wife, Peg and three children.

References

External links
Longtime GOP leader Stabler dies at 77

|-

|-

1930 births
2008 deaths
Delaware Attorneys General
Republican Party members of the Delaware House of Representatives
United States Attorneys for the District of Delaware
Deaths from oral cancer
20th-century American politicians
People from Seaford, Delaware